Day of the Woman may refer to:
Day of the Woman, an initial title for I Spit on Your Grave, a 1978 controversial exploitation film
International Women's Day, celebrated on March 8 every year